Disulfur dinitride is the chemical compound with the formula .

Preparation and reactions
Passing gaseous  over silver metal wool at 250–300 °C at low pressure (1mm Hg) yields cyclic .

An alternative uses the less explosive .

 decomposes explosively above 30°C, and is shock sensitive. It readily sublimes, and is soluble in diethyl ether. Traces of water cause it to polymerize into . In the solid state it spontaneously polymerizes forming . It forms adducts with Lewis acids via a nitrogen atom, e.g.

Structure and bonding
The  molecule is a four-membered ring, with alternating S and N atoms. One S atom has valence 4 and the other S atom has valence 2. Both nitrogen atoms has valence 3. The molecule is almost square and planar. The S–N bond lengths are 165.1pm and 165.7pm and the bond angles are very close to 90°. The  molecule is isoelectronic with the cyclic  dication and has 6π electrons. The bonding has been investigated using a spin-coupled valence bond method  and is described as having four framework sigma bonds, with the N atoms bearing a high negative charge and the S atoms a corresponding positive charge. Two π electrons from the sulfur atoms are coupled across the ring making the molecule overall a singlet diradical.

See also
 Sulfur nitride
 Tetrasulfur tetranitride
 Polythiazyl
 Square planar molecular geometry

References

Nitrides
Four-membered rings
Sulfur–nitrogen compounds
Explosive chemicals